Goldilocks is a musical with a book by Jean and Walter Kerr, music by Leroy Anderson, and lyrics by the Kerrs and Joan Ford.

Background
A parody of the silent film era when directors made quickie one-reelers overnight, it focuses on Maggie Harris, a musical comedy star retiring from show business in order to marry into high society, until producer-director Max Grady arrives to remind her she has a contract to star in his film Frontier Woman. The two battle and slapstick situations ensue as the movie evolves into an epic about Ancient Egypt and filming extends well beyond the amount of time Grady promised it would take to make the movie.

Production
Following tryouts in Boston and Philadelphia, the Broadway production, directed by Walter Kerr and choreographed by Agnes de Mille, opened on October 11, 1958 at the Lunt-Fontanne Theatre and closed on February 28, 1959 after 161 performances. The cast included Elaine Stritch (as Maggie), Don Ameche (as Max Grady), Russell Nype (as George Randolph Brown), Margaret Hamilton (as Bessie), Pat Stanley (as Lois Lee), and Patricia Birch (dancer). Ameche was a replacement for Barry Sullivan, originally cast in the role. 

Musicals Tonight! presented the musical in concert in June 2000 in New York City.

42nd Street Moon in San Francisco, California presented the show in staged concert in 2001.

An original cast recording, orchestrated by composer Anderson and Philip J. Lang, was released by Columbia Records.

Jean Kerr later recounted the trials and tribulations of creating a new musical in her books Please Don't Eat the Daisies, The Snake Has All the Lines, and Penny Candy.

Song list

Act I
 Lazy Moon
 Give the Little Lady
 Save a Kiss
 No One'll Ever Love You
 If I Can't Take It with Me
 Who's Been Sitting in My Chair?
 There Never Was a Woman
 The Pussy Foot

Act II
 Lady in Waiting
 The Beast in You
 Shall I Take My Heart and Go?
 Bad Companions
 I Can't Be in Love
 I Never Know When
 The Town House Maxixe (Dance)
 Two Years in the Making
 Heart of Stone (Pyramid Dance)

Awards and nominations
Source: Playbill

Tony Award for Best Featured Actor in a Musical (Nype, winner, in a tie)
Tony Award for Best Featured Actress in a Musical (Stanley, winner)
Tony Award for Best Costume Design (nominee)
Tony Award for Best Choreography (nominee)
Tony Award for Best Conductor and Musical Director (nominee)

References

External links
 Goldilocks at Internet Broadway Database
Goldilocks plot, song list at guidetomusicaltheatre.com

Compositions by Leroy Anderson
1958 musicals
Broadway musicals
Tony Award-winning musicals